Top: tree photographed in the near infrared range. Bottom: same tree in the visible part of the spectrum.

In infrared photography, the film or image sensor used is sensitive to infrared light. The part of the spectrum used is referred to as near-infrared to distinguish it from far-infrared, which is the domain of thermal imaging. Wavelengths used for photography range from about 700 nm to about 900 nm. Film is usually sensitive to visible light too, so an infrared-passing filter is used; this lets infrared (IR) light pass through to the camera, but blocks all or most of the visible light spectrum (the filter thus looks black or deep red). ("Infrared filter" may refer either to this type of filter or to one that blocks infrared but passes other wavelengths.)

When these filters are used together with infrared-sensitive film or sensors, "in-camera effects" can be obtained; false-color or black-and-white images with a dreamlike or sometimes lurid appearance known as the "Wood Effect," an effect mainly caused by foliage (such as tree leaves and grass) strongly reflecting in the same way visible light is reflected from snow. There is a small contribution from chlorophyll fluorescence, but this is marginal and is not the real cause of the brightness seen in infrared photographs. The effect is named after the infrared photography pioneer Robert W. Wood, and not after the material wood, which does not strongly reflect infrared.

The other attributes of infrared photographs include very dark skies and penetration of atmospheric haze, caused by reduced Rayleigh scattering and Mie scattering, respectively, compared to visible light. The dark skies, in turn, result in less infrared light in shadows and dark reflections of those skies from water, and clouds will stand out strongly. These wavelengths also penetrate a few millimeters into skin and give a milky look to portraits, although eyes often look black.

History

Until the early 20th century, infrared photography was not possible because silver halide emulsions are not sensitive to longer wavelengths than that of blue light (and to a lesser extent, green light) without the addition of a dye to act as a color sensitizer. The first infrared photographs (as distinct from spectrographs) to be published appeared in the February 1910 edition of The Century Magazine and in the October 1910 edition of the Royal Photographic Society Journal to illustrate papers by Robert W. Wood, who discovered the unusual effects that now bear his name.
The RPS co-ordinated events to celebrate the centenary of this event in 2010. Wood's photographs were taken on experimental film that required very long exposures; thus, most of his work focused on landscapes. A further set of infrared landscapes taken by Wood in Italy in 1911 used plates provided for him by C. E. K. Mees at Wratten & Wainwright. Mees also took a few infrared photographs in Portugal in 1910, which are now in the Kodak archives.

Infrared-sensitive photographic plates were developed in the United States during World War I for spectroscopic analysis, and infrared sensitizing dyes were investigated for improved haze penetration in aerial photography.  After 1930, new emulsions from Kodak and other manufacturers became useful to infrared astronomy.

Infrared photography became popular with photography enthusiasts in the 1930s when suitable film was introduced commercially. The Times regularly published landscape and aerial photographs taken by their staff photographers using Ilford infrared film. By 1937, 33 kinds of infrared film were available from five manufacturers including Agfa, Kodak and Ilford.
Infrared movie film was also available and was used to create day-for-night effects in motion pictures. A notable example being the pseudo-night aerial sequences in the James Cagney/Bette Davis movie, The Bride Came COD.

False-color infrared photography became widely practiced with the introduction of Kodak Ektachrome Infrared Aero Film and Ektachrome Infrared EIR. The first version of this, known as Kodacolor Aero-Reversal-Film, was developed by Clark and others at the Kodak for camouflage detection in the 1940s. The EIR film became more widely available in 35mm form in the 1960s but has been since discontinued.

Infrared photography became popular with a number of 1960s recording artists, because of the unusual results; Jimi Hendrix, Donovan, Frank Zappa and the Grateful Dead all issued albums with infrared cover photos. The unexpected colors and effects that infrared film can produce fit well with the psychedelic aesthetic that emerged in the late 1960s.

Infrared light lies between the visible and microwave portions of the electromagnetic spectrum. Infrared light has a range of wavelengths, just like visible light has wavelengths that range from red light to violet. "Near infrared" light is closest in wavelength to visible light and "far infrared" is closer to the microwave region of the electromagnetic spectrum. The longer, far infrared wavelengths are about the size of a pin head and the shorter, near infrared ones are the size of cells, or are microscopic.

Focusing infrared

Most manual focus 35 mm SLR and medium format SLR lenses have a red dot, line or diamond, often with a red "R" called the infrared index mark, that can be used to achieve proper infrared focus; many autofocus lenses no longer have this mark. When a single-lens reflex (SLR) camera is fitted with a filter that is opaque to visible light, the reflex system becomes useless for both framing and focusing, one must compose the picture without the filter and then attach the filter. This requires the use of a tripod to prevent the composition from changing.  A sharp infrared photograph can be done with a tripod, a narrow aperture (like ) and a slow shutter speed without focus compensation, however wider apertures like  can produce sharp photos only if the lens is meticulously refocused to the infrared index mark, and only if this index mark is the correct one for the filter and film in use. Diffraction effects inside a camera are greater at infrared wavelengths so that stopping down the lens too far may actually reduce sharpness.

Most apochromatic ('APO') lenses do not have an Infrared index mark and do not need to be refocused for the infrared spectrum because they are already optically corrected into the near-infrared spectrum. Catadioptric lenses do not often require this adjustment because their mirror containing elements do not suffer from chromatic aberration and so the overall aberration is comparably less. Catadioptric lenses do, of course, still contain lenses, and these lenses do still have a dispersive property.

Zoom lenses may scatter more light through their more complicated optical systems than prime lenses, that is, lenses of fixed focal length; for example, an infrared photo taken with a 50 mm prime lens may have more contrast than the same image taken at 50 mm with a 28–80 zoom.

Some lens manufacturers such as Leica never put IR index marks on their lenses. The reason for this is that any index mark is only valid for one particular IR filter and film combination, and may lead to user error. Even when using lenses with index marks, focus testing is advisable as there may be a large difference between the index mark and the subject plane.

Film cameras

Many conventional cameras can be used for infrared photography, where infrared is taken to mean light of a wavelength only slightly longer than that of visible light. Photography of rather longer wavelengths is normally termed thermography and requires special equipment.

With some patience and ingenuity, most film cameras can be used. However, some cameras of the 1990s that used 35mm film have infrared sprocket-hole sensors that can fog infrared film (their manuals may warn against the use of infrared film for this reason). Other film cameras are not completely opaque to infrared light.

Black-and-white infrared film
Black-and-white infrared negative films are sensitive to wavelengths in the 700 to 900 nm near infrared spectrum, and most also have a sensitivity to blue light wavelengths. The notable halation effect or glow often seen in the highlights of infrared photographs is an artifact of Kodak High Speed Infrared (HIE) black-and-white negative film and not an artifact of infrared light. The glow or blooming is caused by the absence of an anti-halation layer on the back side of Kodak HIE film, this results in a scattering or blooming around the highlights that would usually be absorbed by the anti-halation layer in conventional films.

The majority of black-and-white infrared art, landscape, and wedding photography is done using orange (15 or 21), red (23, 25, or 29) or visually opaque (72) filters over the lens to block the blue visible light from the exposure. The intent of filters in black-and-white infrared photography is to block blue wavelengths and allow infrared to pass through. Without filters, infrared negative films look much like conventional negative films because the blue sensitivity lowers the contrast and effectively counteracts the infrared look of the film. Some photographers use orange or red filters to allow slight amounts of blue wavelengths to reach the film, and thus lower the contrast. Very dark-red (29) filters block out almost all blue, and visually opaque (70, 89b, 87c, 72) filters block out all blue and also visible red wavelengths, resulting in a more pure-infrared photo with a more pronounced contrast.

Certain infrared-sensitive films like Kodak HIE must only be loaded and unloaded in total darkness. Infrared black-and-white films require special development times but development is usually achieved with standard black-and-white film developers and chemicals (like D-76). Kodak HIE film has a polyester film base that is very stable but extremely easy to scratch, therefore special care must be used in the handling of Kodak HIE throughout the development and printing/scanning process to avoid damage to the film. The Kodak HIE film was sensitive to 900 nm.

As of November 2, 2007, "KODAK is preannouncing the discontinuance" of HIE Infrared 35 mm film stating the reasons that, "Demand for these products has been declining significantly in recent years, and it is no longer practical to continue to manufacture given the low volume, the age of the product formulations and the complexity of the processes involved."
At the time of this notice, HIE Infrared 135-36 was available at a street price of around $12.00 a roll at US mail order outlets.

Arguably the greatest obstacle to infrared film photography has been the increasing difficulty of obtaining infrared-sensitive film. As of 2020-10-20, the discontinuance of Kodak HIE and Efke's IR820 has now narrowed the selection for black and white infrared film to the Rollei Infrared 400 film, which has become the only IR film on the market with good sensitivity beyond 750 nm; the Rollei film does extend beyond 750 nm but IR sensitivity falls off very rapidly.

Color infrared film

Color infrared transparency films have three sensitized layers that, because of the way the dyes are coupled to these layers, reproduce infrared as red, red as green, and green as blue. All three layers are sensitive to blue so the film must be used with a yellow filter, since this will block blue light but allow the remaining colors to reach the film. The health of foliage can be determined from the relative strengths of green and infrared light reflected; this shows in color infrared as a shift from red (healthy) towards magenta (unhealthy). Early color infrared films were developed in the older E-4 process, but Kodak later manufactured a color transparency film that could be developed in standard E-6 chemistry, although more accurate results were obtained by developing using the AR-5 process. In general, color infrared does not need to be refocused to the infrared index mark on the lens.

In 2007 Kodak announced that production of the 35 mm version of their color infrared film (Ektachrome Professional Infrared/EIR) would cease as there was insufficient demand. Since 2011, all formats of color infrared film have been discontinued. Specifically, Aerochrome 1443 and SO-734.

There is no currently available digital camera that will directly produce the same results as Kodak color infrared film although the equivalent images can be produced by taking two exposures, one infrared and the other full-color, and combining in post-production. A yellow (minus-blue) filter can also be used, which provides a single image that can also be post-processed to emulate the Ektachrome look. The color images produced by digital still cameras using infrared-pass filters are not equivalent to those produced on color infrared film. The colors result from varying amounts of infrared passing through the color filters on the photo sites, further amended by the Bayer filtering. While this makes such images unsuitable for the kind of applications for which the film was used, such as remote sensing of plant health, the resulting color tonality has proved popular artistically.

Color digital infrared, as part of full spectrum photography is gaining popularity. The ease of creating a softly colored photo with infrared characteristics has found interest among hobbyists and professionals.

Availability

In 2008, Los Angeles photographer, Dean Bennici started cutting and hand rolling Aerochrome color Infrared film. All Aerochrome medium and large format which exists today came directly from his lab. The trend in infrared photography continues to gain momentum with the success of photographer Richard Mosse and multiple users all around the world.

Digital cameras

Digital camera sensors are inherently sensitive to infrared light, which would interfere with the normal photography by confusing the autofocus calculations or softening the image (because infrared light is focused differently from visible light), or oversaturating the red channel. Also, some clothing is transparent in the infrared, leading to unintended (at least to the manufacturer) uses of video cameras. Thus, to improve image quality and protect privacy, many digital cameras employ infrared blockers. Depending on the subject matter, infrared photography may not be practical with these cameras because the exposure times become overly long, often in the range of 30 seconds, creating noise and motion blur in the final image. However, for some subject matter the long exposure does not matter or the motion blur effects actually add to the image. Some lenses will also show a 'hot spot' in the center of the image as their coatings are optimized for visible light and not for IR.

An alternative method of DSLR infrared photography is to remove the infrared blocker in front of the sensor and replace it with a filter that removes visible light. This filter is behind the mirror, so the camera can be used normally - handheld, normal shutter speeds, normal composition through the viewfinder, and focus, all work like a normal camera. Metering works but is not always accurate because of the difference between visible and infrared refraction. When the IR blocker is removed, many lenses which did display a hotspot cease to do so, and become perfectly usable for infrared photography. Additionally, because the red, green and blue micro-filters remain and have transmissions not only in their respective color but also in the infrared, enhanced infrared color may be recorded.

Since the Bayer filters in most digital cameras absorb a significant fraction of the infrared light, these cameras are sometimes not very sensitive as infrared cameras and can sometimes produce false colors in the images. An alternative approach is to use a Foveon X3 sensor, which does not have absorptive filters on it; the Sigma SD10 DSLR has a removable IR blocking filter and dust protector, which can be simply omitted or replaced by a deep red or complete visible light blocking filter. The Sigma SD14 has an IR/UV blocking filter that can be removed/installed without tools. The result is a very sensitive digital IR camera.

While it is common to use a filter that blocks almost all visible light, the wavelength sensitivity of a digital camera without internal infrared blocking is such that a variety of artistic results can be obtained with more conventional filtration. For example, a very dark neutral density filter can be used (such as the Hoya ND400) which passes a very small amount of visible light compared to the near-infrared it allows through. Wider filtration permits an SLR viewfinder to be used and also passes more varied color information to the sensor without necessarily reducing the Wood effect. Wider filtration is however likely to reduce other infrared artefacts such as haze penetration and darkened skies. This technique mirrors the methods used by infrared film photographers where black-and-white infrared film was often used with a deep red filter rather than a visually opaque one.

Another common technique with near-infrared filters is to swap blue and red channels in software (e.g. Adobe Photoshop) which retains much of the characteristic 'white foliage' while rendering skies a glorious blue.

Several Sony cameras had the so-called Night Shot facility, which physically moves the blocking filter away from the light path, which makes the cameras very sensitive to infrared light. Soon after its development, this facility was 'restricted' by Sony to make it difficult for people to take photos that saw through clothing. To do this the iris is opened fully and exposure duration is limited to long times of more than 1/30 second or so. It is possible to shoot infrared but neutral density filters must be used to reduce the camera's sensitivity and the long exposure times mean that care must be taken to avoid camera-shake artifacts.

Fuji have produced digital cameras for use in forensic criminology and medicine which have no infrared blocking filter. The first camera, designated the S3 PRO UVIR, also had extended ultraviolet sensitivity (digital sensors are usually less sensitive to UV than to IR). Optimum UV sensitivity requires special lenses, but ordinary lenses usually work well for IR. In 2007, FujiFilm introduced a new version of this camera, based on the Nikon D200/ FujiFilm S5 called the IS Pro, also able to take Nikon lenses. Fuji had earlier introduced a non-SLR infrared camera, the IS-1, a modified version of the FujiFilm FinePix S9100. Unlike the S3 PRO UVIR, the IS-1 does not offer UV sensitivity. FujiFilm restricts the sale of these cameras to professional users with their EULA specifically prohibiting "unethical photographic conduct".

Phase One digital camera backs can be ordered in an infrared modified form.

Remote sensing and thermographic cameras are sensitive to longer wavelengths of infrared (see ).  They may be multispectral and use a variety of technologies which may not resemble common camera or filter designs. Cameras sensitive to longer infrared wavelengths including those used in infrared astronomy often require cooling to reduce thermally induced dark currents in the sensor (see Dark current (physics)).  Lower cost uncooled thermographic digital cameras operate in the Long Wave infrared band (see Thermographic camera). These cameras are generally used for building inspection or preventative maintenance but can be used for artistic pursuits as well, such as this image of a cup of coffee.

See also

Thermographic camera
Ultraviolet photography
FinePix IS Pro

Notes

External links 

 Simple Introduction to Digital Infrared Photography
All you ever wanted to know about digital UV and IR photography, but could not afford to ask
Gisle Hannemyr's Digital Infrared Resource Page will help you decide if your digital camera is IR-sensitive, and more
Conversion instructions for the Canon G1
List of cameras and their usefulness in digital infrared photography, and lenses that do and don't produce "ir hot-spots".
Short video showing how to take infrared photographs
Make your own budget IR camera
Common problems with shooting digital infrared and how to avoid them

Photographic processes
Photographic techniques
Infrared imaging